Duncan William MacNaughton Scott  (born 6 May 1997) is a Scottish swimmer representing Great Britain at the FINA World Aquatics Championships and the Olympic Games, and Scotland at the Commonwealth Games. Scott made history after winning four medals - more than any other British athlete at a single Olympic Games in Tokyo 2020 - and becoming Great Britain's most decorated swimmer in Olympic history. An all-rounder in the pool, Scott has swum internationally in 100 and 200 metres freestyle and butterfly, and 200 metres individual medley.  He has won a gold at the Olympics and two golds at the World Championships in 4 x 200 metre freestyle relay, a gold in the 4 x 100 metre medley relay, as well as silvers at the World Championships and Olympics in freestyle and medley relay. Individually, Scott was the 100 metre freestyle champion at the 2015 European Games and 2018 Commonwealth Games, and the 200 metre freestyle champion at the same European Games and the 2018 European Aquatics Championships.

Winning three gold medals in the (100 m and 200 m freestyle, and 4 × 100 m freestyle relay) at the 2015 European Games, he was the most successful British athlete at the Games.  A month later, he formed part of the Great Britain squad that won the gold medal at the 2015 World Aquatics Championships in the men's 4 x 200 metre freestyle relay as the 4th leg swimmer in the heat. In 2016, he was a member of the Great Britain team that won silver in the final of the same event at the Olympic Games as well as the men's 4 x 100 metre medley relay. The same team also won the 4 x 100 metre medley relay silver in the 2017 World Championships. A noted relay swimmer, Scott broke the individual British 200 metre freestyle record leading off in the men's 4 x 200 metre relay, before anchoring the team that won gold in 4 x 100 metre medley relay at the 2019 World Championships.

Early life
Duncan Scott grew up in Alloa, moving to Strathallan School on a sport scholarship at the beginning of secondary. He trained daily throughout his high school years.

Career
Scott came to public attention when he won eight gold medals at the 2013 Scottish Age Group Championships in Edinburgh. Later that year he competed at the 2013 European Youth Summer Olympic Festival taking gold in the 200 m medley,  silvers in the (400 m medley, 4 × 100 m mixed freestyle) and bronze in the 4 × 100 m freestyle.

In July 2014, at the 2014 European Junior Championships, Scott won a gold medal in the (200 m individual medley, 4 × 100 m freestyle) and bronze in the 4 × 200 m freestyle. A few weeks later he won a silver medal in the 4 × 200 m freestyle relay with Scotland at the 2014 Commonwealth Games.  He then competed at the 2014 Youth Olympics in Nanjing taking gold in the 4 × 100 m freestyle (with Luke Greenbank, Miles Munro, and Martyn Walton).

At the inaugural 2015 European Games in Baku (a junior event for swimmers), he won three gold medals in the (100 m freestyle, 200 m freestyle and 4 × 100 m freestyle relay) and three silver medals in the 4 × 200 m freestyle, 4 × 100 m mixed freestyle, and 4 × 100 m medley (with Greenbank, Charlie Attwood, and Walton).

2016
In the 2016 Rio Olympics, he won a silver in the 4 × 200 m freestyle relay with Stephen Milne, James Guy, and Dan Wallace. He also won another silver in the 4 × 100 m medley relay with Chris Walker-Hebborn, James Guy and Adam Peaty.  He was placed 5th in the final of the individual men's 100 metres freestyle.

2017
In the 2017 World Aquatics Championships. He won gold in the 4 × 200 m freestyle with James Guy, Stephen Milne and Nick Grainger in a time of seven minutes 1.70 seconds.  He won a further silver in the 4 × 100 m medley relay at the World Championship with same Olympic line-up of Walker-Hebborn, Guy and Peaty.

2018
At the 2018 Commonwealth Games, Scott won the gold medal in the 100 metre freestyle in a time of 48.02 seconds. He also won four bronze medals at the Games: in the 200 metre butterfly, 200 metre freestyle, 4 × 100 metre freestyle relay, and 4 × 200 metre freestyle relay, and became the first Scottish athlete to win five medals a single Commonwealth Games.  He added a sixth medal when he won the silver medal in the 200 metre individual medley.

At the 2018 European Championships, Scott won a silver in the 100 metre freestyle.  Later the same day he won gold as part of the relay team in the 4 × 200 metre freestyle relay with Calum Jarvis, Thomas Dean and James Guy. He also won gold in the 200 metre freestyle, despite only having just made the final in 8th place. He added a third gold in the final day of the championships, winning the men's 4 × 100 metre medley relay as part of the British team with Adam Peaty, James Guy and Nicholas Pyle.

On 13 September he was named Scottish Sportsperson of the Year at the Team Scotland Scottish Sports Awards.

2019
At the 2019 World Aquatics Championships held in Gwangju, South Korea, Scott came joint fourth in the 200 m freestyle, but the first-placed finisher Danas Rapšys was disqualified for a false start, and Scott was awarded a bronze medal together with Martin Malyutin. After the medal ceremony, Scott refused to shake hands and take pictures with the gold medallist Sun Yang, who had previously been banned for a trimetazidine drug offence in 2014 for three months and was involved in an ongoing doping case controversy. This transpired following Australian Mack Horton's refusal to share a podium with Yang at the medal ceremony when the Chinese national anthem was played. Both Yang and Scott were given official warnings from FINA; Scott was subjected to death threats from Yang's fans on social media.

In the lead-off leg in the men's 4 × 200 m freestyle relay final, Scott broke the British national record with a time of 1:44:91; the team finished fifth in the race. In the men's 4 × 100 metre medley relay together with Adam Peaty, James Guy and Luke Greenbank, he swam the anchor leg in  46.14 seconds, the second fastest freestyle relay split of all time, and the fastest in textile. He managed to overcome a 1.11 second deficit to finish in front of the United States team, thereby winning Britain's first gold medal in the event in the World Championships in a European record time of three minutes, 28.10 seconds.

2020

In November 2020, at the International Swimming League meet held in Budapest, Scott competing as part of the London Roar team set a new British record in short course 200m freestyle with a time of 1:40.76, and in 200m individual medley with a time of 1:51.66.

Based on his 2019 individual world championship result, Scott was pre-selected for the postponed 2020 Tokyo Olympics.

2021
At the 2021 British Swimming Olympic trials, Scott broke the British record in the 200m individual medley with a time of 1:55.90. In May 2021, Scott won a silver medal in 200m freestyle at the European Championships. He also won two gold medals in the men's 4 x 100 m medley and mixed 4 × 100 metre freestyle relays, as well as two silvers in the men's 4 × 100 metre freestyle and 4 × 200 metre freestyle relays.
 
At the 2020 Tokyo Olympics, Duncan won silver in 200m freestyle, finishing 0.04 seconds behind the winner and teammate, Tom Dean. He followed it up with a gold as part of the 4×200m freestyle relay team with Tom Dean, James Guy, and Matt Richards, winning it in a European record of 6 minutes 58.58 seconds. He also claimed a silver in men's 200 metre individual medley, and another in the 4 × 100 metre medley relay with Luke Greenbank, Adam Peaty, and James Guy, making him the first British athlete to win four medals in a single Games leading to calls for him to be nominated for a knighthood.

In the 2021 International Swimming League, Scott won match most valuable player honours for the fifteenth match of the overall season, which was the fourth match of the playoffs season, narrowly winning top honours over Ryan Murphy of LA Current by 4.0 points.

Scott was appointed Member of the Order of the British Empire (MBE) in the 2022 New Year Honours for services to swimming.

2022
At the 2022 British Swimming Championships in April, Scott won the 400 metre individual medley with a Commonwealth record, British record, 2022 World Aquatics Championships and 2022 Commonwealth Games qualifying time of 4:09.18. On 2 May, he was officially nominated by Scottish Swimming to be a member of Team Scotland for the 2022 Commonwealth Games. He withdrew from the 2022 World Championships in advance of the start of competition due to training difficulties leading up to the start of the Championships in June. In mid-July, approximately a week before the start of swimming competition at the 2022 Commonwealth Games, he withdrew from the 2022 European Aquatics Championships.

2022 Commonwealth Games

On the second day of swimming competition at the 2022 Commonwealth Games, held in Birmingham, England in July and August, Scott swam a 1:47.16 in the preliminaries of the 200 metre freestyle, qualifying for the final ranking second. Later in the morning, he ranked seventh in the preliminaries of the 400 metre individual medley, swimming a time of 4:20.92 to qualify for the final. In the final of the 200 metre freestyle, he won the gold medal with a time of 1:45.02. He followed his gold medal up with a bronze medal in the 400 metre individual medley with a time of 4:11.27. The following day, Scott ranked third in the preliminaries of the 200 metre butterfly and advanced to the final with his time of 1:57.48. In his second event of the morning, the 100 metre freestyle, he qualified for the semifinals. For the evening finals session, he started off with a fifth-place finish in the 200 metre butterfly in a time of 1:56.89. Less than an hour later, he ranked sixth in the semifinals of the 100 metre freestyle with a 48.78 and qualified for the final.

In the final of the 100 metre freestyle on day four, Scott finished in a time of 48.27 seconds and won the bronze medal. Later in the session, he won a bronze medal in the 4×200 metre freestyle relay, splitting a 1:44.48 for the fourth leg of the relay to help finish in 7:09.33. His relay bronze medal marked his eleventh total medal at the Commonwealth Games and he became the most decorated Scottish competitor across all Commonwealth Games, breaking the former record of ten total medals set by shooter Alister Allan in 1994. Two days later, on the sixth and final day, he qualified for the final of the 200 metre individual medley along with fellow Scotsman Mark Szaranek, ranking third with a time of 2:00.41. In the final, he won the gold medal with a Games record time of 1:56.88. For his final event of the Games, he split a 51.74 for the butterfly leg of the 4×100 metre medley relay in the final to help win the bronze medal with a Scottish record time of 3:35.11.

2022 Swimming World Cup
At his first FINA Swimming World Cup, the 2022 FINA Swimming World Cup stop held in November in Indianapolis, United States, Scott placed eighth in the 400 metre freestyle with a 3:45.35 on day one, twelfth in the 200 metre individual medley with a time of 1:58.50 on day two, tenth in the 400 metre individual medley on day three with a 4:12.98, and fifteenth in the 200 metre freestyle with a 1:44.80, also on day three.

International championships

Long course metres (50 m pool)

 Scott swam only in the prelims heats.

Short course metres (25 m pool)

Personal best times

Long course metres (50 m pool)

Short course metres (25 m pool)

Awards and honours
 International Swimming League, Match Most Valuable Player: 2021 Match 15

See also
List of Commonwealth Games medallists in swimming (men)
List of 2015 European Games medal winners
List of World Aquatics Championships medalists in swimming (men)
List of Youth Olympic Games gold medalists who won Olympic gold medals

Notes

References

External links
 
 
 
 
 
 
 
 
 Duncan Scott at The-Sports.org

1997 births
Living people
Sportspeople from Glasgow
People educated at Strathallan School
British male swimmers
Scottish male swimmers
British male freestyle swimmers
Male medley swimmers
Swimmers at the 2014 Commonwealth Games
Swimmers at the 2018 Commonwealth Games
Commonwealth Games medallists in swimming
Commonwealth Games gold medallists for Scotland
Commonwealth Games silver medallists for Scotland
Commonwealth Games bronze medallists for Scotland
European Games gold medalists for Great Britain
European Games medalists in swimming
Swimmers at the 2015 European Games
World Aquatics Championships medalists in swimming
Swimmers at the 2014 Summer Youth Olympics
European Aquatics Championships medalists in swimming
Olympic swimmers of Great Britain
Swimmers at the 2016 Summer Olympics
Swimmers at the 2020 Summer Olympics
Olympic silver medallists for Great Britain
Medalists at the 2016 Summer Olympics
Medalists at the 2020 Summer Olympics
Olympic gold medalists in swimming
Olympic silver medalists in swimming
Scottish Olympic medallists
People from Alloa
Alumni of the University of Stirling
Sportspeople from Clackmannanshire
Youth Olympic gold medalists for Great Britain
Members of the Order of the British Empire
Medallists at the 2014 Commonwealth Games
Medallists at the 2018 Commonwealth Games